is a Japanese former footballer.

Career statistics

Club

Notes

References

1988 births
Living people
Japanese footballers
Association football goalkeepers
Yokohama F. Marinos players
YSCC Yokohama players
Japan Soccer College players
Albirex Niigata Singapore FC players
Singapore Premier League players
Japan Football League players
Japanese expatriate sportspeople in Singapore
Expatriate footballers in Singapore